The  is a tilting electric multiple unit (EMU) train type operated by Nagoya Railroad (Meitetsu) on limited express services in Japan since January 2005.

Operations
The 2000 series operates as an access train serving Central Japan International Airport (Centrair), and entered service in January 2005, shortly before the airport opened.

While intended for rapid airport service, this train also serves other routes as a regular limited express train.

Formations
The fleet of 12 four-car sets are formed as shown below, with one trailer (T) car and three motored (M) cars. The Mo 2150 cars were added to the original 3-car sets in 2006.

Cars 3 and 4 are each equipped with one single-arm pantograph. Car 2 has a toilet.

Each four-car set can carry up to 181 passengers.

The maximum acceleration velocity is 2.3km/h/s and the common deceleration velocity is 3.5km/h/s with an emergency potential of 4.2km/h/s.

Seats and facilities
Each car has four luggage spaces (Except a number of sets). Each seat has continuous large windows with UV-cut glass and roll-up curtains that can be operated individually by customers.

History
The trains entered service on 29 January 2005, initially formed as a fleet of 10 three-car sets. From 29 April 2006, additional cars were added to the fleet to form 12 4-car sets to cope with demand.

Awards
In October 2005, the 2000 series was awarded the "Good Design" award.

In June 2006, the train was one of the four recipients of the 46th Laurel Prize presented annually by the Japan Railfan Club. A presentation ceremony was held at Central Japan International Airport Station on 4 November 2006.

Special liveries 

From 14 January 2020, a 2000 series set was wrapped in a Neon Genesis Evangelion-inspired livery.

References

External links

 Meitetsu 2000 series information 

Electric multiple units of Japan
2000 series
Train-related introductions in 2005
Tilting trains
Nippon Sharyo multiple units
1500 V DC multiple units of Japan